Osbert is a male given name and a surname. 

It may refer to: Osbert , a novel by R.A. Currier

Given name 

Osbert or Osberht of Northumbria (died 867), King of Northumbria
Osbert or Osbeorn Bulax (died c. 1054), son of Siward, Earl of Northumbria
Osbert de Bayeux (fl. 1121−1184), medieval English cleric and archdeacon
Osbert of Clare (died in or after 1158), monk, elected prior of Westminster Abbey and briefly abbot, writer, hagiographer and forger of charters
Osbert of Dunblane (died 1230), Bishop of Dunblane
Osbert de Longchamp (c. 1155–before 1208), Anglo-Norman administrator
O. G. S. Crawford (1886-1957), English archaeologist and a pioneer in the use of aerial photographs in his field
Osbert fitzHervey (died 1206), Anglo-Norman royal judge
Osbert Lancaster (1908-1986), English cartoonist, author, art critic and stage designer
Osbert Mackie (1869-1927), English rugby union centre and Anglican priest
Osbert Molyneux, 6th Earl of Sefton (1871-1930), British courtier and Liberal politician
Osbert Mordaunt (1876-1949), English cricketer
Osbert Peake, 1st Viscount Ingleby (1897-1966), British Conservative Party politician
Osbert Salvin (1835-1898), English naturalist, ornithologist and herpetologist
Osbert Sitwell (1892-1969), English writer

Surname 

Alphonse Osbert (1857-1939), French painter
William Fitz Osbert (died 1196), champion of the poor in London

Given names
English given names
English masculine given names